Timothy P. Riordan (born July 15, 1960) is a former American football quarterback who played one season with the New Orleans Saints of the National Football League. He was drafted by the St. Louis Cardinals in the third round of the 1984 NFL Supplemental Draft. He played college football at Temple University and attended New London High School in New London, Connecticut. Riordan was also a member of the Philadelphia/Baltimore Stars.

References

External links
Just Sports Stats
College stats

Living people
1960 births
Players of American football from Connecticut
American football quarterbacks
Temple Owls football players
Philadelphia/Baltimore Stars players
New Orleans Saints players
Sportspeople from New London, Connecticut
National Football League replacement players